Decarydendron is a genus of flowering plants belonging to the family Monimiaceae.

Its native range is Madagascar.

The genus name of Decarydendron was named after Raymond Decary (1891–1973), French botanist, ethnologist and colonial administrator who conducted research in Madagascar and collected for the National Museum of Natural History, France.

Known species:

Decarydendron helenae 
Decarydendron lamii 
Decarydendron perrieri 
Decarydendron ranomafanensis

References

Monimiaceae
Monimiaceae genera
Endemic flora of Madagascar